John Henry Vander Wal (born April 29, 1966) is an American former Major League Baseball left-handed hitter who played outfield and first base for eight different teams over 14 seasons. He is now a coach for the West Michigan Whitecaps.

Early life
Vander Wal grew up in Hudsonville, Michigan and graduated from Hudsonville High School in Hudsonville. He was drafted in the 8th round of the 1984 Major League Baseball Draft by the Houston Astros. He did not sign with Houston, and instead attended Western Michigan University. He was drafted by the Montreal Expos in the third round of the 1987 Major League Baseball Draft.

Major league career
Vander Wal made his major league debut with the Expos on September 6, and finished his first season with 13 hits in 61 at-bats for a .213 batting average.

On August 31, he was traded to the San Diego Padres for a PTBNL. He went on to appear in the World Series with the Padres, recording two hits in five at-bats.

Vander Wal spent  in San Diego before moving on to the Pittsburgh Pirates in a  trade that brought Al Martin to the Padres. While playing for the Pirates, he posted his best season, appearing in 134 games, and batting .299 with 24 home runs and 94 RBI. In , Vander Wal was traded to the San Francisco Giants, who later traded him to the New York Yankees for Jay Witasick.

Vander Wal played 14 seasons in the major leagues. 13 of these seasons were with National League clubs, where the pinch hitter is a much more widely used tactic in the absence of the designated hitter.

In 1372 games over 14 seasons, Vander Wal posted a .261 batting average (717-for-2751) with 374 runs, 170 doubles, 18 triples, 97 home runs, 430 RBI, 38 stolen bases, 385 bases on balls, .351 on-base percentage and .441 slugging percentage. He finished his career with a .987 fielding percentage playing at right and left field and first base. In 16 postseason games, he hit .286 (6-for-21) with 2 runs, 1 double, 1 triple, 1 home run and 4 RBI.

On February 10, Vander Wal was named a scout for the San Diego Padres and held that position until 2016.

Achievements
Vander Wal holds the modern Major League Baseball single-season record for pinch hits, with 28 in 1995 while playing for the Colorado Rockies. In 2017, Ichiro Suzuki almost equaled Vander Wal's record, but finished with 27 pinch-hits. In his career, Vander Wal contributed 129 pinch hits, which is one of the highest totals of the modern era, behind Lenny Harris' 212.

Vander Wal was inducted into the Western Michigan University Athletic Hall of Fame in 2003.

References

External links
 

 Baseball Almanac
 Baseball-Reference.com

1966 births
Living people
American expatriate baseball players in Canada
American people of Dutch descent
Arizona Diamondbacks scouts
Baseball players from Grand Rapids, Michigan
Cincinnati Reds players
Colorado Rockies players
Colorado Springs Sky Sox players
Indianapolis Indians players
Jacksonville Expos players
Jamestown Expos players
Louisville Bats players
Major League Baseball first basemen
Major League Baseball left fielders
Major League Baseball right fielders
Milwaukee Brewers players
Montreal Expos players
New York Yankees players
People from Hudsonville, Michigan
Pittsburgh Pirates players
San Diego Padres players
San Diego Padres scouts
San Francisco Giants players
West Palm Beach Expos players
Western Michigan Broncos baseball players